Ilex mucronata, the mountain holly or catberry, is a species of holly native to eastern North America, from Newfoundland west to Minnesota, and south to Maryland and West Virginia.

Taxonomy
It was formerly treated in its own monotypic genus as Nemopanthus mucronatus (L.) Loes., known as "false holly", but transferred to Ilex on molecular data; it is closely related to Ilex amelanchier.

Description
Ilex mucronata is a deciduous shrub growing to 3 m (rarely 4 m) tall (or 6 to 10 feet high from the "Manual of Woody Landscape Plants" by Dr. Michael Dirr.) The leaves are alternate, simple, elliptic to oblong, (1 to 2.5" long and 3/4's as wide) 1.5–7 cm long and 1–3 cm broad, with an entire or finely serrated margin and an acute apex, and a 0.5–2 cm (1/4 to 1/2" long) petiole. The tiny flowers about 1/5" in diameter with 4 to 5 petals are inconspicuous, whitish to greenish-yellow, produced on slender peduncles 25 mm or more long; it is usually dioecious, with male and female flowers on separate plants. The fruit is a red drupe 6–7 mm (1/4 to 1/3") diameter containing three to five pits.

Habitat
The plant does best in full sun, or part shade is good. It usually grows in moist or draining wet acid soils, often with the similar species of Common Winterberry, Ilex verticillata, but is also found on upland cliffs and slopes on hills and mountains. It develops a yellow autumn color. It is recommended for use in naturalistic landscapes. Its USDA hardiness zone recommendation is zones 4 to 6. The name "mountain holly" is also sometimes used for the related mountain winterberry (Ilex montana).

Gallery

References

External links

mucronata
Flora of the Great Lakes region (North America)
Flora of Eastern Canada
Flora of the Northeastern United States
Flora of Michigan
Flora of Maryland
Flora of West Virginia
Flora of New Jersey
Flora without expected TNC conservation status